Lake Eufaula State Park is a  Oklahoma state park located in McIntosh County, Oklahoma on Lake Eufaula. The park was formerly known as Fountainhead State Park. Fountainhead, together with the neighboring Arrowhead State Park, were created in 1965. Fountainhead's name was changed to Lake Eufaula State Park effective November 1, 2002. Arrowhead is now known as the Arrowhead Area at Lake Eufaula State Park.

The park has a swimming area with a beach, and multiple boat ramps. Fishing is possible year-round, and a marina and a tackle shop are located within the park. The Deep Fork Nature Center is located within the park; and there are hiking, mountain bike, and equestrian trails. On Hummingbird Beach, there is an 18-hole disc golf course. The park also has campsites for RV and tents, as well as three yurts.

Fees
To help fund a backlog of deferred maintenance and park improvements, the state implemented an entrance fee for this park and 21 others effective June 15, 2020.  The fees, charged per vehicle, start at $10 per day for a single-day or $8 for residents with an Oklahoma license plate or Oklahoma tribal plate.  Fees are waived for honorably discharged veterans and Oklahoma residents age 62 & older and their spouses.  Passes good for three days or a week are also available; annual passes good at all 22 state parks charging fees are offered at a cost of $75 for out-of-state visitors or $60 for Oklahoma residents.  The 22 parks are:
 Arrowhead Area at Lake Eufaula State Park
 Beavers Bend State Park
 Boiling Springs State Park
 Cherokee Landing State Park
 Fort Cobb State Park
 Foss State Park
 Honey Creek Area at Grand Lake State Park
 Great Plains State Park
 Great Salt Plains State Park
 Greenleaf State Park
 Keystone State Park
 Lake Eufaula State Park
 Lake Murray State Park
 Lake Texoma State Park
 Lake Thunderbird State Park
 Lake Wister State Park
 Natural Falls State Park
 Osage Hills State Park
 Robbers Cave State Park
 Sequoyah State Park
 Tenkiller State Park
 Twin Bridges Area at Grand Lake State Park

Fountainhead Lodge
The park was formerly home to Fountainhead Lodge, a 202-room state-run resort hotel financed by state bonds and federal economic development loans. Fountainhead was one of two lodges built on Eufaula Lake in 1965, the other being Arrowhead Lodge at Arrowhead State Park. The lodge was never very profitable, and the state was threatened with foreclosure on both Arrowhead and Fountainhead by the federal government in 1983. The lodge closed in December, 1984, and was deeded to the U.S. Economic Development Administration. In 1985, the lodge was sold to a group led by Melvyn Bell of Little Rock, Arkansas. By 1990, Bell Equities had invested millions of dollars in upgrades. In 2005, the lodge was sold at sheriff's auction to the Muscogee (Creek) Nation, who subsequently demolished the hotel in 2008. At the time of demolition, the Muscogee Nation had plans to build a new resort at the same location.

References

1965 establishments in Oklahoma
Nature centers in Oklahoma
Protected areas established in 1965
Protected areas of McIntosh County, Oklahoma
State parks of Oklahoma